Bangpung, Peucedanum japonicum, is a namul vegetable also called "coastal hogfennel".

Bangpung may also refer to:

 Saposhnikovia divaricata, aka Siler, a medicinal herb
 Glehnia littoralis, a namul vegetable also called "beach silvertop"